Rommel Angara may refer to:
 Rommel T. Angara (born 1978), Filipino politician
 Rommel N. Angara (born 1980), Filipino poet and essayist